Milan Jelić (26 March 1956 – 30 September 2007) was a Bosnian Serb politician. From 9 November 2006 until his death from a heart attack on 30 September 2007, he was the 6th President of Republika Srpska.

Born near Modriča, Jelić completed his secondary education in Doboj and has graduated from the University of Novi Sad Faculty of Economics at Subotica, Serbia. He gained a doctorate from the University of Banja Luka. He has two sons, Petar and Dimitrije.

Jelić spent four years on the local council in Modriča, and at the beginning of 1987 he was appointed manager of OOUR in the town. There he spent seven years, until he was appointed general manager of Modriča. After the Dayton Agreement was signed he was elected to the National Assembly of Republika Srpska. He also served as president of the Football Association of Republika Srpska, and was Member of the Presidency of the Football Association of Bosnia and Herzegovina.

On the afternoon of 30 September 2007, during his usual training session in Modriča, Jelić experienced heart failure, and died shortly afterwards, after an unsuccessful resuscitation attempt in a Doboj hospital.

Personal life

Petar Jelić, a professional footballer, is his son.

References 

 

1956 births
2007 deaths
People from Modriča
Serbs of Bosnia and Herzegovina
University of Novi Sad alumni
Alliance of Independent Social Democrats politicians
University of Banja Luka alumni
Presidents of the Football Association of Bosnia and Herzegovina
Bosnia and Herzegovina chairpersons of corporations